Johan Ulfstjerna is a 1923 Swedish silent drama film directed by John W. Brunius and starring Ivan Hedqvist, Anna Olin and Mary Johnson. It was shot at the Råsunda Studios in Stockholm. The film's sets were designed by the art director Vilhelm Bryde. It was based on the 1907 play Johan Ulfstjerna by Tor Hedberg, which was later remade as a 1936 sound film of the same title.

Synopsis
The film takes place in Helsinki at the turn of the twentieth century when an underground resistance movement attempts to liberate Finland from the Russian Empire.

Cast
 Ivan Hedqvist as 	John Ulfstjerna
 Anna Olin as Adelaide Ulfstjerna
 Einar Hanson as 	Helge Ulfstjerna
 Mary Johnson as Agda
 John Ekman as 	Governor
 Rudolf Wendbladh as 	Reback
 Albion Örtengren as 	Mr. Gauvin
 Ernst Brunman as 	Police Officer 
 Anton De Verdier as 	Conspirator 
 Bengt Djurberg as Conspirator 
 Olle Hilding as 	Conspirator 
 Berta Hillberg as 	Maid 
 Gösta Hillberg as 	Secretary General 
 Torsten Hillberg as Conspirator 
 Axel Högel as 	Cinspirator 
 Ollars-Erik Landberg as 	Conspirator 
 Herman Lantz as 	Police Officer 
 Nils Ohlin as 	Conspirator 
 Sven Quick as 	Conspirator 
 Paul Seelig as 	Conspirator

References

Bibliography
 Sadoul, Georges. Dictionary of Film Makers. University of California Press, 1972.

External links

1923 films
1923 drama films
Swedish drama films
Swedish silent feature films
Swedish black-and-white films
Films directed by John W. Brunius
1920s Swedish-language films
Swedish films based on plays
Films set in Helsinki
Films set in the 1890s
Films set in the 1900s
Silent drama films
1920s Swedish films